Presidency refers to the executive branch of a nation's government under a President.

Presidency may also refer to:

Presidency of the Council of the European Union
Lay presidency at the Eucharist
Presidency (Pakistan), is the official residence and the principal workplace of the President of Pakistan
Presidencies of British India; one of the following four former provinces (or former residency of Bengal in the case of Penang):
 Bengal Presidency (Presidency of Fort William)
 Bombay Presidency
 Madras Presidency (Presidency of Fort St. George)
 Penang Presidency
Presidency College; one of the following colleges in India (named for the Presidencies they were instituted in):
Presidency College, Chennai
Presidency College, Kolkata
Presidency University, Bangladesh
Presidency School, in Bangalore
Bosnian Presidency

See also
First Presidency, Latter Day Saint movement
First Presidency (LDS Church)